Astro Chase is a multidirectional shooter written by Fernando Herrera for the Atari 8-bit family. It was published by First Star Software in 1982 as the company's first game. Parker Brothers licensed it, releasing cartridge versions for the Atari 8-bit family and Atari 5200 console in 1983 and a Commodore 64 version in 1984. Exidy licensed it for arcade use with its Max-A-Flex cabinet.

Gameplay takes place on a 2D scrolling map of space around Earth, which the player has to defend from an alien force. The primary target is a number of Mega-Mines, which approach the Earth and must be destroyed.

Gameplay
The game opens with the player looking at a scene at a spaceport, in a simulated 3D view. A flying saucer is hovering just to the right of center, and the player's character is seen exiting a terminal building on the left, walking to the spaceship, waving goodbye, and then beaming aboard.

The view then cuts to space, where the player uses the joystick to cause the screen to rapidly scroll in the selected direction, creating the illusion of flight in the chosen direction. The screen is filled with planets and other objects. When the user presses the fire button on the joystick, the stick stops causing the ship to move, and instead fires its weapon in the chosen direction. The ship can simultaneously move and fire in different directions.

The enemy aliens attack the player with an endless supply of attack saucers; however, they not the player's main opponent. The real threat is the 16 Megamines that start at the end of the universe and slowly make their way towards planet Earth, displayed in the center of the game map. If a single Megamine manages to reach Earth, the planet explodes.

The game's music is an endless loop of the 1812 Overture. After destroying all 16 Megamines in a given level, the player is able to move to the next of the 36 levels. Every four levels, the ship returns to Earth, where a cut scene animation is shown.

Development
In 1981, Atari, Inc. introduced the Atari Star Award for the best new program distributed though their Atari Program Exchange. The winner of the first $25,000 grand prize was Fernando Herrera for My First Alphabet, a children's game.

Fernando was working at a computer retail store owned by Billy Blake who was also partners with Richard Spitalny at the time. Billy and Richard, then feature film producers, decided to start and fund an interactive software company to showcase Fernado's talents. Richard and Billy funded the company, naming it First Star Software. Astro Chase was the first title from the new company, released on 7 December 1982.

Reception
Astro Chase spent three months in Popular Computer World'''s top-ten list and became the first game to be awarded "Computer Game of the Month" by Dealerscope. The game was awarded "1984 Best Science Fiction/Fantasy Computer Game" at the 5th annual Arkie Awards, where judges described it as "slam-bang space battle" and praised its animated intermissions.

The Atari computer system version of Astro Chase was reviewed by Video magazine in its "Arcade Alley" column where it was described as "a state-of-the-art space shoot-out" and as "a revolutionary game with graphic achievements of stunning virtuosity". Reviewers specifically praised the game's innovative "single thrust propulsion" mechanic.

Allen Doum reviewed the game for Computer Gaming World, and stated that "What qualifies Astro Chase as "state of the art" is the graphics presentation. The full scrolling playfield is not only drawn beautifully, but changes with each chase."Softline stated that "Astro Chase is just about all you could ask for in an arcade game ... an exercise in class and style", citing its "Tremendous graphics".

In a retrospective review of the Atari 5200 version, Keita Iida wrote, "the gorgeous 3-D starfield is just another 2-D maze—with round obstructions instead of walls." He concluded, "Astro Chase is one big letdown and serves as a reminder that graphics are only skin deep."

Legacy
In 1994, MacPlay released a first-person reworking of the game for the Macintosh as Astro Chase 3D.

References

External links
Astro Chase for the Atari 8-bit family at Atari Mania
Astro Chase at Arcade History''

1982 video games
Arcade video games
Atari 8-bit family games
Atari 5200 games
Commodore 64 games
Exidy games
Single-player video games
Multidirectional shooters
Video games developed in the United States
First Star Software games